Betula gmelinii is a species of birch native to the Altai, Siberia, Mongolia, northeastern China, the Korean peninsula and Hokkaido in Japan. It prefers to live in sandy soils. Its 'Mount Apoi' cultivar has gained the Royal Horticultural Society's Award of Garden Merit.

References

gmelinii
Plants described in 1835
Taxa named by Alexander von Bunge